Fusarium  is a large genus of filamentous fungi, part of a group often referred to as hyphomycetes, widely distributed in soil and associated with plants. Most species are harmless saprobes, and are relatively abundant members of the soil microbial community. Some species produce mycotoxins in cereal crops that can affect human and animal health if they enter the food chain. The main toxins produced by these Fusarium species are fumonisins and trichothecenes. Despite most species apparently being harmless (some existing on the skin as commensal members of the skin flora), some Fusarium species and subspecific groups are among the most important fungal pathogens of plants and animals.

The name of Fusarium comes from Latin fusus, meaning a spindle.

Taxonomy 
The taxonomy of the genus is complex. A number of different schemes have been used, and up to 1,000 species have been identified at times, with approaches varying between wide and narrow concepts of speciation (lumpers and splitters).

Phylogenetic studies indicate seven major clades within the genus.

There is a proposed conceptwidely subscribed by specialiststhat would include essentially the genus as it now stands, including especially all agriculturally significant Fusaria. There is a counterproposal (unrelated to ) that goes far in the other direction, with seven entirely new genera.

Subdivision 
Various schemes have subdivided the genus into subgenera and sections. There is a poor correlation between sections and phylogenetic clades.

Sections previously described include:

 Arachnites
 Arthrosporiella
 Discolour
 Elegans
 Eupionnotes
 Gibbosum
 Lateritium
 Liseola
 Martiella
 Ventricosum
 Roseum
 Spicarioides
 Sporotrichiella

Species 
Selected species include:

 Fusarium acaciae
 Fusarium fujikuroi
 Fusarium acaciae-mearnsii
 Fusarium acutatum
 Fusarium aderholdii
 Fusarium acremoniopsis
 Fusarium affine
 Fusarium arthrosporioides
 Fusarium avenaceum
 Fusarium bubigeum
 Fusarium circinatum
 Fusarium crookwellense
 Fusarium culmorum
 Fusarium graminearum
 Fusarium incarnatum
 Fusarium langsethiae
 Fusarium mangiferae
 Fusarium merismoides
 Fusarium oxysporum
 Fusarium pallidoroseum
 Fusarium poae
 Fusarium proliferatum
 Fusarium pseudograminearum
 Fusarium redolens
 Fusarium sacchari
 Fusarium solani
 Fusarium sporotrichioides
 Fusarium sterilihyphosum
 Fusarium subglutinans
 Fusarium sulphureum
 Fusarium tricinctum
 Fusarium udum
 Fusarium venenatum
 Fusarium verticillioides
 Fusarium virguliforme
 Fusarium xyrophilum

Etymology 
The name of Fusarium comes from Latin fusus, meaning a spindle.

Pathogen 

The genus includes a number of economically important plant pathogenic species.

Fusarium graminearum commonly infects barley if there is rain late in the season. It is of economic impact to the malting and brewing industries, as well as feed barley. Fusarium contamination in barley can result in head blight, and in extreme contaminations, the barley can appear pink. The genome of this wheat and maize pathogen has been sequenced. F. graminearum can also cause root rot and seedling blight. The total losses in the US of barley and wheat crops between 1991 and 1996 have been estimated at $3 billion.

Fusarium oxysporum f.sp. cubense is a fungal plant pathogen that causes Panama disease of banana (Musa spp.), also known as fusarium wilt of banana. Panama disease affects a wide range of banana cultivars, which are propagated asexually from offshoots and therefore have very little genetic diversity. Panama disease is one of the most destructive plant diseases of modern times, and caused the commercial disappearance of the once dominant Gros Michel cultivar. A more recent strain also affects the Cavendish cultivars which commercially replaced Gros Michel. It is considered inevitable that this susceptibility will spread globally and commercially wipe out the Cavendish cultivar, for which there are currently no acceptable replacements.

Fusarium oxysporum f. sp. narcissi causes rotting of the bulbs (basal rot) and yellowing of the leaves of daffodils (Narcissi).

In 2021 it was discovered that Fusarium xyrophilum was able to hijack a South American species of yellow-eyed Xyris grass, creating fake flowers, fooling bees and other pollinating insects into visiting them, taking fungal spores to other plants.

In humans 
Some species may cause a range of opportunistic infections in humans. In humans with normal immune systems, fusarial infections may occur in the nails (onychomycosis) and in the cornea (keratomycosis or mycotic keratitis).  In humans whose immune systems are weakened in a particular way, (neutropenia, i.e., very low neutrophils count), aggressive fusarial infections penetrating the entire body and bloodstream (disseminated infections) may be caused by members of the Fusarium solani complex, Fusarium oxysporum, Fusarium verticillioides, Fusarium proliferatum and, rarely, other fusarial species.

Research 
The isolation medium for Fusaria is usually peptone PCNB agar (peptone pentachloronitrobenzene agar, PPA). For F. oxysporum specifically, Komada's medium is most common. Differential identification is difficult in some strains. Vegetative compatibility group analysis is best for some, is one usable method for others, and requires such a large number of assays that it is too complicated for yet others.

Use as human food 
Fusarium venenatum is produced industrially for use as a human food by Marlow Foods, Ltd., and is marketed under the name Quorn in Europe and North America.

Fusarium strain flavolapis is also produced as a human food by Nature's Fynd under the name Fy in North America. It is used as a part of Le Bernardin menu in several dishes.

Some consumers of fusarium products have shown food allergies similar in nature to peanut and other food allergies.  People with known sensitivities to molds should exercise caution when consuming such products.

Biological warfare 
Mass casualties occurred in the Soviet Union in the 1930s and 1940s when Fusarium-contaminated wheat flour was baked into bread, causing alimentary toxic aleukia with a 60% mortality rate.  Symptoms began with abdominal pain, diarrhea, vomiting, and prostration, and within days, fever, chills, myalgias and bone marrow depression with granulocytopenia and secondary sepsis occurred.  Further symptoms included pharyngeal or laryngeal ulceration and diffuse bleeding into the skin (petechiae and ecchymoses), melena, bloody diarrhea, hematuria, hematemesis, epistaxis, vaginal bleeding, pancytopenia and gastrointestinal ulceration.  Fusarium sporotrichoides contamination was found in affected grain in 1932, spurring research for medical purposes and for use in biological warfare.  The active ingredient was found to be trichothecene T-2 mycotoxin, and it was produced in quantity and weaponized prior to the passage of the Biological Weapons Convention in 1972.  The Soviets were accused of using the agent, dubbed "yellow rain", to cause 6,300 deaths in Laos, Kampuchea, and Afghanistan between 1975 and 1981.  The "biological warfare agent" was later purported to be merely bee feces, but the issue remains disputed.

Pest
Fusarium has posed a threat to the ancient cave paintings in Lascaux since 1955, when the caves were first opened to visitors. The caves subsequently closed and the threat subsided, but the installation of an air conditioning system in 2000 caused another outbreak of the fungus which is yet to be resolved.

Microbiota
Fusarium may be part of microbiota including digestive as well as oral/dental, there have been rare cases of Fusariosis presenting as a necrotic ulceration of the gingiva, extending to the alveolar bone has been reported in a granulocytopenic patient.

References

Bibliography

External links 
 Fusarium and Verticillium Wilts of Tomato, Potato, Pepper, and Eggplant
 Fusarium Root Rot in Container Tree Nurseries
 Fusarium Blight on Turfgrass
 Fusarium Keratitis
 Evolution of Fusarium taxonomy. FAO 2014
 Fusarium Comparative Database 
 
 Simple explanation of Fusarium. FAO 2014

 
Fungal plant pathogens and diseases
Animal diseases
Nectriaceae genera